Bridge in Fishing Creek Township was a historic concrete arch bridge located in Fishing Creek Township in Columbia County, Pennsylvania. It was a  open spandrel, single-span arch bridge constructed in 1915.  The bridge featured a pierced molded concrete parapet with light, star-shaped designs.  It crossed Little Pine Creek, but has been demolished.

The bridge was listed on the National Register of Historic Places in 1988.

References 

Road bridges on the National Register of Historic Places in Pennsylvania
Bridges completed in 1915
Bridges in Columbia County, Pennsylvania
National Register of Historic Places in Columbia County, Pennsylvania
Concrete bridges in the United States
Open-spandrel deck arch bridges in the United States